Luzuriaga may refer to:

Luzuriaga, Spain
A locality in Valencia, Negros Oriental, Philippines
Luzuriaga (plant), a genus of plants in the family Alstroemeriaceae
 Lorenzo Luzuriaga, Spanish and Argentinian educationalist
Luzuriaga, Toribio de, a governor of Cuyo in Argentina